The GeForce 3 series (NV20) is the third generation of Nvidia's GeForce graphics processing units (GPUs). Introduced in February 2001, it advanced the GeForce architecture by adding programmable pixel and vertex shaders, multisample anti-aliasing and improved the overall efficiency of the rendering process.

The GeForce 3 was unveiled during the 2001 Macworld Conference & Expo/Tokyo 2001 in Makuhari Messe and powered realtime demos of Pixar's Junior Lamp and id Software's Doom 3. Apple would later announce launch rights for its new line of computers.

The GeForce 3 family comprises 3 consumer models: the GeForce 3, the GeForce 3 Ti200, and the GeForce 3 Ti500.  A separate professional version, with a feature-set tailored for computer aided design, was sold as the Quadro DCC. A derivative of the GeForce 3, known as the NV2A, is used in the Microsoft Xbox game console.

Architecture

Introduced three months after Nvidia acquired the assets of 3dfx and marketed as the nFinite FX Engine, the GeForce 3 was the first Microsoft Direct3D 8.0 compliant 3D-card. Its programmable shader architecture enabled applications to execute custom visual effects programs in Microsoft Shader language 1.1. It is believed that the fixed-function T&L hardware from GeForce 2 was still included on the chip for use with Direct3D 7.0 applications, as the single vertex shader was not fast enough to emulate it yet. With respect to pure pixel and texel throughput, the GeForce 3 has four pixel pipelines which each can sample two textures per clock. This is the same configuration as GeForce 2, excluding the slower GeForce 2 MX line.

To take better advantage of available memory performance, the GeForce 3 has a memory subsystem dubbed Lightspeed Memory Architecture (LMA). This is composed of several mechanisms that reduce overdraw, conserve memory bandwidth by compressing the z-buffer (depth buffer) and better manage interaction with the DRAM.

Other architectural changes include EMBM support (first introduced by Matrox in 1999) and improvements to anti-aliasing functionality. Previous GeForce chips could perform only super-sampled anti-aliasing (SSAA), a demanding process that renders the image at a large size internally and then scales it down to the end output resolution. GeForce 3 adds multi-sampling anti-aliasing (MSAA) and Quincunx anti-aliasing methods, both of which perform significantly better than super-sampling anti-aliasing at the expense of quality. With multi-sampling, the render output units super-sample only the Z buffers and stencil buffers, and using that information get greater geometry detail needed to determine if a pixel covers more than one polygonal object. This saves the pixel/fragment shader from having to render multiple fragments for pixels where the same object covers all of the same sub-pixels in a pixel. This method fails with texture maps which have varying transparency (e.g. a texture map that represents a chain link fence). Quincunx anti-aliasing is a blur filter that shifts the rendered image a half-pixel up and a half-pixel left in order to create sub-pixels which are then averaged together in a diagonal cross pattern, destroying both jagged edges but also some overall image detail. Finally, the GeForce 3's texture sampling units were upgraded to support 8-tap anisotropic filtering, compared to the previous limit of 2-tap with GeForce 2. With 8-tap anisotropic filtering enabled, distant textures can be noticeably sharper.

Performance
The GeForce 3 GPU (NV20) has the same theoretical pixel and texel throughput per clock as the GeForce 2 (NV15). GeForce 2 Ultra is clocked 25% faster than the original GeForce 3 and 43% faster than the Ti200; this means that in select instances, like Direct3D 7 T&L benchmarks, the GeForce 2 Ultra and sometimes even GTS can outperform the GeForce 3 and Ti200, because the newer GPUs use the same fixed-function T&L unit, but are clocked lower. The GeForce 2 Ultra also has considerable raw memory bandwidth available to it, only matched by the GeForce 3 Ti500. However, when comparing anti-aliasing performance the GeForce 3 is clearly superior because of its MSAA support and memory bandwidth/fillrate management efficiency.

When comparing the shading capabilities to the Radeon 8500, reviewers noted superior precision with the ATi card.

Product positioning
Nvidia refreshed the lineup in October 2001 with the release of the GeForce 3 Ti200 and Ti500. This coincided with ATI's releases of the Radeon 8500 and Radeon 7500. The Ti500 has higher core and memory clocks (240 MHz core/250 MHz RAM) than the original GeForce 3 (200 MHz/230 MHz), and generally matches the Radeon 8500. The Ti200 was the slowest, and lowest-priced GeForce3 release. It is clocked lower (175 MHz/200 MHz) yet it surpasses the Radeon 7500 in speed and feature set besides dual-monitor implementation.

The original GeForce3 was only released in 64 MiB configurations, while the Ti200 and Ti500 were also released as 128 MiB versions.

Specifications

Discontinued support 
Nvidia has ceased driver support for GeForce 3 series.

Final drivers include
 Windows 9x & Windows Me: 81.98 released on December 21, 2005; Download;
Product Support List Windows 95/98/Me – 81.98.
 Windows 2000, 32-bit Windows XP & Media Center Edition: 93.71 released on November 2, 2006; Download.
(Despite claims in the documentation that 94.24 supports the Geforce 3 series, it does not)
 The Windows 2000/XP drivers may be installed on later versions of Windows, such as Windows 7. They do not support the "Aero"-effects of Windows 7, however.

(Products supported list also on this page)
Windows 95/98/Me Driver Archive
Windows XP/2000 Driver Archive

Successor 
The GeForce 4 Series (Non-MX), introduced in April 2002, was a revision of the GeForce 3 architecture. The budget variant, dubbed the GeForce 4 MX, was closer in terms of design to the GeForce 2.

See also 
Graphics card
Graphics processing unit
Kelvin (microarchitecture)

References

External links

 Nvidia: GeForce3 - The Infinite Effects GPU
 ForceWare 81.98 drivers, Final Windows 9x/ME driver release
 ForceWare 93.71 drivers, Final Windows XP driver release
 Anandtech: Nvidia GeForce3
 Anandtech: Nvidia's Fall Product Line: GeForce3 Titanium
 techPowerUp! GPU Database

Computer-related introductions in 2001
3 Series
Graphics cards